Lindera obtusiloba, the blunt-lobed spice bush, is a species of flowering plant in the laurel family Lauraceae, native to China, Korea and Japan. Juvenile leaves are lobed (as the name suggests) and are deep purple. The leaves often turn yellow in autumn.

This plant has gained the Royal Horticultural Society's Award of Garden Merit.

Uses 
A Lindera obtusiloba water extract inhibited mast-cell-derived allergic inflammation in vitro and vivo, suggesting it may have possible uses in allergic diseases such as allergic rhinitis, asthma and atopic dermatitis.

The plant contains the anti-histamine compound koaburaside.

References

External links

obtusifolia
Plants described in 1851